Arthur Lyon may refer to:

 Arthur Lyon (fencer) (1876–1952), American fencer
 Arthur Lyon (rugby union) (1851–1905), England rugby union international
 Arthur Sidney Lyon (1817–1861), Australian journalist and newspaper proprietor
Arthur Anderson Lyon (1876–1962), founder of Arthur Lyon & Co.

See also 
 Arthur Lyon Bowley (1869–1957), English statistician and economist
 Arthur Lyon Cross (1873–1940), American historian

Companies
 Arthur Lyon & Co (ALCO), British manufacturer of generator sets